The men's vault competition was one of eight events for male competitors in artistic gymnastics at the 1960 Summer Olympics in Rome. It was held on 5, 7, and 10 September at the Baths of Caracalla. There were 129 competitors from 28 nations, with nations in the team competition having up to 6 gymnasts and other nations entering up to 2 gymnasts. For the second straight Games, there was a tie for first place in the vault. Boris Shakhlin of the Soviet Union and Takashi Ono of Japan each received a gold medal. It was the third consecutive Games with a gold medal for the Soviets. Ono, who had taken bronze in 1952, became the second man to win multiple vault medals. Third place and the bronze medal went to Soviet Vladimir Portnoi.

The 1960 gymnastics competitions introduced apparatus finals, with the all-around competition serving as a qualifying round for the vault final.

Background

This was the 10th appearance of the event, which is one of the five apparatus events held every time there were apparatus events at the Summer Olympics (no apparatus events were held in 1900, 1908, 1912, or 1920). Four of the top 10 gymnasts from 1956 returned: bronze medalist Yury Titov of the Soviet Union, fourth-place finisher Boris Shakhlin of the Soviet Union, sixth-place finisher (and 1952 silver medalist) Masao Takemoto of Japan, and seventh-place finisher Jack Beckner of the United States. Also returning was Takashi Ono of Japan, bronze medalist in 1952 and 16th place in 1956. The 1958 World Championship podium was (in order) Titov, Takemoto, and Ono.

Morocco and South Korea each made their debut in the men's vault; the short-lived United Arab Republic made its only appearance. The United States made its ninth appearance, most of any nation, having missed only the inaugural 1896 Games.

Competition format

The gymnastics all-around events continued to use the aggregation format. Each nation entered a team of six gymnasts or up to two individual gymnasts. All entrants in the gymnastics competitions performed both a compulsory exercise and a voluntary exercise for each apparatus. The scores for all 12 exercises were summed to give an individual all-around score. The event used a "vaulting horse" aligned parallel to the gymnast's run (rather than the modern "vaulting table" in use since 2004).

These exercise scores were also used for qualification for the new apparatus finals. The two exercises (compulsory and voluntary) for each apparatus were summed to give an apparatus score; the top 6 in each apparatus participated in the finals; others were ranked 7th through 130th. For the apparatus finals, the all-around score for that apparatus was multiplied by one-half then added to the final round exercise score to give a final total.

Exercise scores ranged from 0 to 10, with the final total apparatus score from 0 to 20.

Schedule

All times are Central European Time (UTC+1)

Results

References

Official Olympic Report
www.gymnasticsresults.com
www.gymn-forum.net

Men's Vault
Men's 1960
Men's events at the 1960 Summer Olympics